"Babe I'm Gonna Leave You" is a folk song written by Anne Bredon in the late 1950s. Joan Baez recorded a solo version for her 1962 album Joan Baez in Concert and a variety of musicians subsequently adapted it to a variety of styles, including Led Zeppelin.  Several songwriters have been credited on releases over the years, although Bredon usually receives a sole or partial credit on current releases.

Joan Baez rendition
In 1960, Anne Bredon appeared on a live folk-music show on radio station KPFA in Berkeley, California, where she performed "Babe I'm Gonna Leave You". Janet Smith heard the performance and later Joan Baez learned the song from Smith at Oberlin College.

The 1962 album Joan Baez in Concert includes a solo performance with her vocal and acoustic guitar picking. Vanguard Records co-owner/producer Maynard Solomon commented in the album liner notes: "The strange quality [and power] of the song is that the narrator inwardly desires exactly the opposite of what he will do, and is torn by the prospect of his self-imposed departure." He also describes the song as a "white blues", but does not identify the songwriter.  When CD versions of Baez' album were later issued, Anne L. Bredon appears as the sole songwriter.

Due to the popularity of her album, Baez' rendition was adapted by the Plebs (with members of the Nashville Teens) (1964 single), the Association (1965 single), Mark Wynter (1965 single), Quicksilver Messenger Service (1968 Revolution soundtrack), and Led Zeppelin (1969 Led Zeppelin). The songwriters originally listed for these early versions include "  Dennis", Anne H. Bredon, Janet Smith, Paul Bennett, Erik Darling, and "Traditional arr. by Jimmy Page".

Led Zeppelin version

Guitarist Jimmy Page heard Baez' version and began developing "Babe I'm Gonna Leave You" early in his career as a session guitarist. He played the song for singer Robert Plant during their first meeting at Page's riverside home at Pangbourne in late July 1968. In his book Stairway to Heaven, Zeppelin tour manager Richard Cole claims that the arrangement evolved when Plant played Page the guitar part that eventually appeared on the album; however, this has been refuted by Page. In an interview, Page commented, "I used to do the song in the days of sitting in the darkness playing my six-string behind Marianne Faithfull." 

Although based on the Baez version, Led Zeppelin came up with a very different approach.  They incorporate hard rock sections with electric guitar that are performed by the whole group, thus more than doubling the length of Baez' original. When the recording appeared on their 1969 debut album, the credit read "Traditional, arr. by Jimmy Page" following the unspecified (at the time) authorship of the track on Baez's album. In the 1980s, Bredon was made aware of Led Zeppelin's version of the song; since 1990, the Led Zeppelin version has been credited to Anne Bredon, Jimmy Page, and Robert Plant. Bredon received a substantial back-payment of royalties.

The band played this song at Led Zeppelin concerts on its 1969 concert tours; a filmed performance at Danmarks Radio, Gladsaxe, Denmark, on March 17, 1969, is included on the Led Zeppelin DVD (2003).  For their 1998 reunion, Page and Plant performed a 9-minute version of the song. Plant has performed the song as a solo artist and with his bands Strange Sensation and the Sensational Space Shifters.

As of 2002, the 1969 promotional EP using the song as the A-side track and "Dazed and Confused" as B-side had been one of top ten Led Zeppelin music collectibles. A collector, Rick Barrett, dedicated to his Led Zeppelin memorabilia, sold several copies of the promo EP for –500 each, "depending on the condition of the sleeve and of the record itself," said Barrett.

See also
List of Led Zeppelin songs written or inspired by others

References

External links
 Led Zeppelin

1969 singles
1950s songs
Atlantic Records singles
Led Zeppelin songs
Joan Baez songs
Songs written by Jimmy Page
Songs written by Robert Plant
Hard rock ballads
Song recordings produced by Jimmy Page
Year of song missing